Pipalkot may refer to:

Pipalkot, Bheri
Pipalkot, Seti